Diphenyldichloromethane is an organic compound with the formula (C6H5)2CCl2.  It is a colorless solid that is used as a precursor to other organic compounds.

Synthesis
It is prepared from carbon tetrachloride and anhydrous aluminium chloride as catalyst in a double Friedel-Crafts alkylation of benzene.  Alternatively,
benzophenone is treated with phosphorus pentachloride: 
(C6H5)2CO  +  PCl5  →   (C6H5)2CCl2  +  POCl3

Reactions
It undergoes hydrolysis to benzophenone.
(C6H5)2CCl2  +  H2O  →   (C6H5)2CO  +  2 HCl
It is used in the synthesis of tetraphenylethylene, 
diphenylmethane imine hydrochloride and benzoic anhydride.

References 

Phenyl compounds
Organochlorides